Larzac, also known as the Causse of Larzac (French: Causse du Larzac), is a limestone karst plateau in the south of the Massif Central, France, situated between Millau (in the département of l'Aveyron) and Lodève (in the département of l'Hérault). It is an agricultural area, where traditionally sheep produce milk for Roquefort cheese. Since the early 2010s, the agricultural production has largely diversified.

Geography
The communes of the Larzac are:
Cornus
Creissels
La Cavalerie
La Couvertoirade
La Roque-Sainte-Marguerite
L'Hospitalet-du-Larzac
Le Caylar
Le Cros
Les Rives
Millau
Nant
Saint-Félix-de-l'Héras
Saint-Georges-de-Luzençon
Saint-Maurice-Navacelles
Saint-Michel-d'Alajou
Saint-Pierre-de-la-Fage
Sainte-Eulalie-de-Cernon
Sorbs
La Vacquerie-et-Saint-Martin-de-Castries
Vissec

The Larzac is served by junctions 46 to 51 of the A75 autoroute.

History

In October 1970, Michel Debré, then Minister of Defence, decided for strategic purposes to expand a military camp outside the village of La Cavalerie in the department of Aveyron, from 30 km² to 170 km², without consulting the local population. Local farmers objected and decided to fight against the project, through actions such as the occupation of empty farms purchased by the Army in anticipation of this expansion. French syndicalist and peasant activist José Bové moved there during this period in support of the protests. Communards from the nearby Community of the Ark, led by the pacifist Lanza del Vasto, were also very active in opposition to the camp. The workers of the occupied and self-managed LIP factory also took part in the movement.

Following ten years of nonviolent resistance, the plan was cancelled by President François Mitterrand after his election in 1981.

Because of its history, the Larzac  was chosen as the site of a massive meeting against the WTO which took place in August 2003. José Bové currently resides in the Larzac area; he secured nearly 500,000 votes in the 2007 presidential election. He became a Member of the European Parliament in 2009.

Sights
Five medieval fortified villages, related to the Knights Templar and the Knights Hospitaller are located on the Larzac plateau: 
 La Cavalerie
 La Couvertoirade
 Saint-Jean-d'Alcas, part of the Saint-Jean-et-Saint-Paul commune
 Sainte-Eulalie-de-Cernon
 Viala-du-Pas-de-Jaux

References

Plateaus of Metropolitan France
Nonviolence
Massif Central
Landforms of Aveyron
Landforms of Hérault